George C. Justicz (born 27 February 1931) is a former  rower who competed for Great Britain in the 1960 Olympic games and won Double Sculls Challenge Cup at Henley Royal Regatta four times and the Wingfield Sculls.

Biography
Justicz was born in Prague, Czechoslovakia. His family came to England and he became a member of Birmingham Rowing Club where he was captain in 1959 and 1960. He competed in the Diamond Challenge Sculls at Henley Royal Regatta in 1958. In 1959, partnering Nicholas Birkmyre, he was runner up at the Double Sculls Challenge Cup at Henley. In 1960 the pair won the Double Sculls Challenge Cup and went on to compete in the double sculls event at the 1960 Summer Olympics in Rome. Justicz also won the Wingfield Sculls as a single sculler in 1960. Justicz and Birkmyer won the double sculls at Henley again in 1961 and won a silver medal at the 1961 European Rowing Championships. They then joined Leander Club and in 1962 won the double sculls at Henley, came fifth in the 1962 World Rowing Championships and won a gold medal at the 1962 British Empire and Commonwealth Games. They made their final winning appearance in the double sculls at Henley 1964.

References

1931 births
British male rowers
Rowers at the 1960 Summer Olympics
Olympic rowers of Great Britain
Living people
Rowers from Prague
Rowers at the 1962 British Empire and Commonwealth Games
Commonwealth Games medallists in rowing
Commonwealth Games gold medallists for England
British people of Czech descent
European Rowing Championships medalists
Medallists at the 1962 British Empire and Commonwealth Games